The 2022–23 season is the 115th season in the existence of Fleetwood Town Football Club and the club's ninth consecutive season in League One. In addition to the league, they will also compete in the 2022–23 FA Cup, the 2022–23 EFL Cup and the 2022–23 EFL Trophy.

Transfers

In

Out

Loans in

Loans out

Pre-season and friendlies
The Cod Army announced they would travel to Pula in Croatia for a pre-season tour and play one friendly match against local opposition. The first of the clubs friendlies was confirmed on June 8, against Dundee United. A second followed a day later with a trip to Barrow. A behind-closed-doors friendly against Tranmere Rovers was next to be added to the pre-season calendar. As well as Stoke City and Rotherham United. During the club's trip to Croatia, a pre-season meeting with HNK Orijent 1919 was announced. On July 25, it was confirmed a XI side will face FC Halifax Town at Poolfoot Farm.

Competitions

Overall record

League One

League table

Results summary

Results by round

Matches

On 23 June, the league fixtures were announced.

FA Cup

Fleetwood were drawn at home to Oxford City in the first round, away to Ebbsfleet United in the second round, at home to Queens Park Rangers in the third round and away to Sheffield Wednesday in the fourth round.

EFL Cup

Town were drawn at home to Wigan Athletic in the first round and to Everton in the second round.

EFL Trophy

On 20 June, the initial Group stage draw was made, grouping Fleetwood Town with Barrow and Carlisle United. Three days later, Manchester United U21s joined Northern Group G.

References

Fleetwood Town
Fleetwood Town F.C. seasons